An aerospace manufacturer is a company or individual involved in the various aspects of designing, building, testing, selling, and maintaining aircraft, aircraft parts, missiles, rockets, or spacecraft. Aerospace is a high technology industry.

The aircraft industry is the industry supporting aviation by building aircraft and manufacturing aircraft parts for their maintenance.  This includes aircraft and parts used for civil aviation and military aviation. Most production is done pursuant to type certificates and Defense Standards issued by a government body. This term has been largely subsumed by the more encompassing term: "aerospace industry".

Market 

In 2015 the aircraft production was worth US$180.3 Billion: 61% airliners, 14% business and general aviation, 12% Military aircraft, 10% military rotary wing and 3% civil rotary wing; while their MRO was worth $135.1 Bn or $ Bn combined.

The global aerospace industry was worth $838 billion in 2017: Aircraft & Engine OEMs represented 28% ($ Bn), Civil & Military MRO & Upgrades 27% ($ Bn), Aircraft Systems & Component Manufacturing 26% ($ Bn), Satellites & Space 7% ($ Bn), Missiles & UAVs 5% ($ Bn) and other activity, including flight simulators, defense electronics, public research accounted for 7% ($ Bn).
The countries with the largest industry were led by the United States with $408.4 Bn (%) followed by France with $69 Bn (%) then China with $61.2 Bn (%), United Kingdom with $48.8 Bn (%), Germany with $46.2 Bn (%), Russia with $27.1 Bn (%), Canada with $24 Bn (%), Japan with $21 Bn (%), Spain with $14 Bn (%) and India with $11Bn (%). The top 10 countries represent $731 Bn or % of the whole industry.

In 2018, the new commercial aircraft value is projected for $270.4 billion while business aircraft will amount for $18 billion and civil helicopters for $4 billion.

Largest companies

Geography 

In September 2018, PwC ranked aerospace manufacturing attractiveness: the most attractive country was the United States, with $240 billion in sales in 2017, due to the sheer size of the industry (#1) and educated workforce (#1), low geopolitical risk (#4, #1 is Japan), strong transportation infrastructure (#5, #1 is Hong Kong), a healthy economy (#10, #1 is China), but high costs (#7, #1 is Denmark) and average tax policy (#36, #1 is Qatar).
Following were Canada, Singapore, Switzerland and United Kingdom.

Within the US, the most attractive was Washington state, due to the best Industry (#1), leading Infrastructure (#4, New Jersey is #1) and Economy (#4, Texas is #1), good labor (#9, Massachusetts is #1), average tax policy (#17, Alaska is #1) but is costly (#33, Montana is #1).
Washington is tied to Boeing Commercial Airplanes, earning $10.3 billion, is home to 1,400 aerospace-related businesses, and has the highest aerospace jobs concentration.
Following are Texas, Georgia, Arizona and Colorado.

In the US, the Department of Defense and NASA are the two biggest consumers of aerospace technology and products. The Bureau of Labor Statistics of the United States reported that the aerospace industry employed 444,000 wage and salary jobs in 2004, many of which were in Washington and California, this marked a steep decline from the peak years during the Reagan Administration when total employment exceeded 1,000,000 aerospace industry workers.

During that period of recovery a special program to restore U.S. competitiveness across all U.S. industries, Project Socrates, contributed to employment growth as the U.S. aerospace industry captured 72 percent of world aerospace market.  By 1999 U.S. share of the world market fell to 52 percent.

In the European Union, aerospace companies such as Airbus, Safran, BAE Systems, Thales, Dassault, Saab AB, Terma A/S, Patria Plc and Leonardo are participants in the global aerospace industry and research effort.

In Russia, large aerospace companies like Oboronprom and the United Aircraft Corporation (encompassing Mikoyan, Sukhoi, Ilyushin, Tupolev, Yakovlev, and Irkut, which includes Beriev) are among the major global players in this industry.

Cities 

Important locations of the civil aerospace industry worldwide include Seattle, Wichita, Kansas, Dayton, Ohio and St. Louis in the United States (Boeing), Montreal and Toronto in Canada (Bombardier, Pratt & Whitney Canada), Toulouse and Bordeaux in France (Airbus, Dassault, ATR), Seville in Spain and Hamburg in Germany (Airbus, EADS), the North-West of England and Bristol in Britain (BAE Systems, Airbus and AgustaWestland), Komsomolsk-on-Amur and Irkutsk in Russia (Sukhoi, Beriev), Kyiv and Kharkiv in Ukraine (Antonov), Nagoya in Japan (Mitsubishi Heavy Industries Aerospace and Kawasaki Heavy Industries Aerospace), as well as São José dos Campos in Brazil where Embraer is based.

Consolidation 

Several consolidations took place in the aerospace and defense industries over the last few decades.

BAE Systems is the successor company to numerous British aircraft manufacturers which merged throughout the second half of the 20th century. Many of these mergers followed the 1957 Defence White Paper.

Airbus prominently illustrated the European airliner manufacturing consolidation in the late 1960s.

Between 1988 and 2010, more than 5,452 mergers and acquisitions with a total known-value of US$579 billion were announced worldwide.

In 1993, then United States Secretary of Defense Les Aspin and his deputy William J. Perry held the "Last Supper" at the Pentagon with contractors executives who were told that there were twice as many military suppliers as he wanted to see: $55 billion in military–industry mergers took place from 1992 to 1997, leaving mainly Boeing, Lockheed Martin, Northrop Grumman and Raytheon.
Boeing bought McDonnell Douglas for US$13.3 billion in 1996.
Raytheon acquired Hughes Aircraft Company for $9.5 billion in 1997.

Marconi Electronic Systems, a subsidiary of the General Electric Company plc, was acquired by British Aerospace for US$12.3 billion in 1999 merger, to form BAE Systems.

In 2002, when Fairchild Dornier was bankrupt, Airbus, Boeing or Bombardier declined to take the 728JET/928JET large regional jet program as mainline and regional aircraft manufacturers were split and Airbus was digesting its ill-fated Fokker acquisition a decade earlier.

On September 4, 2017, United Technologies acquired Rockwell Collins in cash and stock for $23 billion, $30 billion including Rockwell Collins' net debt, for $500+ million of synergies expected by year four.

The Oct. 16, 2017 announcement of the CSeries partnership between Airbus and Bombardier Aerospace could trigger a daisy chain of reactions towards a new order. 
Airbus gets a new, efficient model at the lower end of the narrowbody market which provides the bulk of airliner profits and can abandon the slow selling A319 while Bombardier benefits from the growth in this expanded market even if it holds a smaller residual stake.
Boeing could forge a similar alliance with either Embraer with its E-jet E2 or Mitsubishi Heavy Industries and its MRJ.

On 21 December, Boeing and Embraer confirmed to be discussing a potential combination with a transaction subject to Brazilian government regulators, the companies' boards and shareholders approvals.
The weight of Airbus and Boeing could help E2 and CSeries sales but the 100-150 seats market seems slow.
As the CSeries, renamed A220, and E-jet E2 are more capable than their predecessors, they moved closer to the lower end of the narrowbodies.
In 2018, the four Western airframers combined into two within nine months as Boeing acquired 80% of Embraer's airliners for $3.8 billion on July 5.

On April 3, 2020, Raytheon and United Technologies Corporation (except Otis Worldwide, leaving Rockwell Collins and engine maker Pratt and Whitney)  merged to form Raytheon Technologies Corporation, with combined sales of $79 billion in 2019.

The most prominent unions between 1995 and 2020 include those of Boeing and McDonnell Douglas; the French, German and Spanish parts of EADS; and United Technologies with Rockwell Collins then Raytheon, but many mergers projects did not went through: Textron-Bombardier, EADS-BAE Systems, Hawker Beechcraft-Superior Aviation, GE-Honeywell, BAE Systems-Boeing (or Lockheed Martin), Dassault-Aerospatiale, Safran-Thales, BAE Systems-Rolls-Royce or Lockheed Martin–Northrop Grumman.

Suppliers 

The largest aerospace suppliers are United Technologies with $28.2 Billion of revenue, followed by GE Aviation with $24.7 Billion, Safran with $22.5 Billion, Rolls-Royce Holdings with $16.9 Billion, Honeywell Aerospace with $15.2 Billion and Rockwell Collins including B/E Aerospace with $8.1 Billion.
The electric aircraft development could generate large changes for the aerospace suppliers.

On 26 November 2018, United Technologies announced the completion of its Rockwell Collins acquisition, renaming systems supplier UTC Aerospace Systems as Collins Aerospace, for $23 billion of sales in 2017 and 70,000 employees, and $39.0 billion of sales in 2017 combined with engine manufacturer Pratt & Whitney.

Supply chain 

Before the 1980s/1990s, aircraft and aeroengine manufacturers were vertically integrated.
Then Douglas aircraft outsourced large aerostructures and the Bombardier Global Express pioneered the "Tier 1" supply chain model inspired by automotive industry, with 10-12 risk-sharing limited partners funding around half of the development costs.
The Embraer E-Jet followed in the late 1990s with fewer than 40 primary suppliers. 
Tier 1 suppliers were led by Honeywell, Safran, Goodrich Corporation and Hamilton Sundstrand.

In the 2000s, Rolls-Royce reduced its supplier count after bringing in automotive supply chain executives.
On the Airbus A380, less than 100 major suppliers outsource 60% of its value, even 80% on the A350XWB.
Boeing embraced an aggressive Tier 1 model for the B787 but with its difficulties began to question why it was earning lower margins than its suppliers while it seemed to take all the risk, ensuing its 2011 Partnering for Success initiative, as Airbus initiated its own Scope+ initiative for the A320.
Tier 1 consolidation also affects engine manufacturers : GE Aviation acquired Avio in 2013 and Rolls-Royce plc is taking control of Industria de Turbo Propulsores.

See also

 Aerospace
 Aerospace industry in the United Kingdom
 Military–industrial complex
 Aircraft industry
 Aircraft industry of Russia
 Aircraft parts industry
 List of aircraft manufacturers
 Space industry
 Space industry of India
 Space industry of Russia
 Commercial Spaceflight Federation (US)
 List of spacecraft manufacturers
 Supplier-furnished equipment

References

Further reading

 Hartley, Keith.  The Political Economy Of Aerospace Industries: A Key Driver of Growth and International Competitiveness? (Edward Elgar, 2014); 288 pages; the industry in Britain, continental Europe, and the US with a case study of BAE Systems.
 Newhouse, John. The Sporty Game: The High-Risk Competitive Business of Making and Selling Commercial Airliners.'' New York: Alfred A. Knopf, 1982. .

External links
 
 
 
 Aerospace Craft & Structural Components

Manufacturer
Manufacturer
Aircraft industry
Aerospace